Carolin Daniels and Lidziya Marozava were the defending champions, but chose not to participate.

Maria Marfutina and Anna Morgina won the title, defeating Raluca Olaru and Alena Tarasova in the final, 6–2, 6–3.

Seeds

Draw

References 
 Draw

Neva Cup - Doubles